Hugh Burnett (July 14, 1918 – September 29, 1991) was an African-Canadian carpenter and a civil rights leader. A descendant of slaves, Hugh Burnett was a carpenter in the rural Canadian town of Dresden,  Ontario. He was active in the National Unity Association (which he co-founded), an anti-discrimination group formed in 1948. At the time, blacks in Dresden and other Ontario towns were regularly refused service in restaurants, barber shops and stores.

History
In his fight against discrimination, Burnett, a plain-spoken, determined activist, engaged the support of Toronto-based groups like the Joint Labour Committee on Human Rights, whose members included Donna Hill (wife of activist Daniel Hill and mother of author Lawrence Hill and singer Dan Hill) and prominent labour activist Bromley Armstrong. Delegations to Ontario Premier Leslie Frost in the early 1950s resulted in the passage of two acts to outlaw discrimination in the province: the Fair Employment Practices Act (outlawing workplace discrimination) and the Fair Accommodation Practices Act (making discrimination illegal in restaurants, stores and other public-access areas). Despite these laws, people in the town continued to practice discrimination. The life of his school-age daughter, Patricia, was threatened.

Under Burnett's direction, in 1954, the NUA staged sit-ins of two restaurants that flouted the law, forcing a court challenge that resulted in victory for the NUA and bringing a legal end to overt discrimination in the province. Despite the victory, Burnett was forced to leave town after citizens boycotted his carpentry business. Hugh was living in London, Ontario when the first black patrons were served in the Dresden restaurant.
On July 31, 2010, the Ontario Heritage Trust unveiled a plaque commemorating the contributions of Hugh Burnett and the National Unity Association to the civil rights movement in Canada. Burnett's story is told in the book "Season of Rage: Hugh Burnett and the Struggle for Civil Rights".

Legacy
A plaque stands on the main street of Dresden, at the corner of St. George and St. John Streets, near the restaurant that refused Burnett service. The Dresden plaque reads:

References

Notes
 the notes are that people who fought for Hugh Burnett were people of color who wanted to have some democracy in their lives.

Further reading

 Cooper, John (2005) Season of Rage: Hugh Burnett and the Struggle for Civil Rights, Tundra Books.
 Dungy, Hilda (1975): Planted by the Waters, Standard Press
 Toronto Telegram archives

External links
 National Film Board http://www.nfb.ca/film/dresden_story/
 National Film Board http://www.nfb.ca/film/journey_to_justice/ 
 Sootoday http://www.sootoday.com/content/news/full_story.asp?StoryNumber=47724
 Chatham Daily News http://www.chathamdailynews.ca/ArticleDisplay.aspx?e=2694488
 Heritage Trust https://web.archive.org/web/20131004232211/http://www.heritagetrust.on.ca/CorporateSite/media/oht/PDFs/Hugh-Burnett-NUA-ENG.pdf
 The Toronto Star https://www.thestar.com/news/2008/07/06/amid_sweeping_change_a_pivotal_anniversary_goes_unremarked.html#

Canadian civil rights activists
Canadian people of African-American descent
People from Chatham-Kent
1918 births
1991 deaths
Black Canadian activists